Wood Job! is a 2014 Japanese comedy film written and directed by Shinobu Yaguchi and based on the novel  by Shion Miura. The film stars Shota Sometani, Masami Nagasawa, and Hideaki Itō. The main theme song is "Happiest Fool", sung by Maia Hirasawa. The film was released on 10 May 2014, and made its North American premiere at LA Eigafest 2014.

Plot
The story revolves around Yuki Hirano (played by Shota Sometani), who, after failing his university entrance examinations and being left by his girlfriend, decides to join a forestry training program on seeing an attractive female face (Nagasawa) on a promotional leaflet. 
The program is difficult, and while he wants to quit, he continues.  Many others from the program drop out. Initially being skeptical of the newcomer, the villagers grow to like him and accept him as one of their own.

However, he soon discovers that the job is harder than he expected, working under the hard-working superior played by Hideaki Itō. Yuki learns respect for the forest, and the traditions of the town, opening his eyes to life outside a big city. All the while, he pursues the woman from the pamphlet whose beauty motivated to move in the first place.  The film ends with the Onbashira Festival, a dangerous festival involving riding huge logs down a hill.

Cast
The following people appear in the film.
 Shota Sometani as Yūki Hirano
 Masami Nagasawa as Naoki Ishii
 Hideaki Itō as Yoki Iida
 Yūka as Miki Iida
 Naomi Nishida as Yūko Nakamura
 Sports Makita as Iwao Tanabe
 Masashi Arifuku as Saburō Koyama
 Yoshimasa Kondo as a senior executive director of forestry association
 Ken Mitsuishi as Seiichi Nakamura
 Akira Emoto as Toshirō Yamane
 Yuki Furukawa

Production
The film was shot on location in the mountains of Mie Prefecture, taking approximately six weeks and completed by 31 July 2013.

Reception
The film has grossed ¥107 million in Japan.

References

External links
  
 

2014 comedy-drama films
2014 films
Films based on Japanese novels
Films directed by Shinobu Yaguchi
Japanese comedy-drama films
Toho films
2014 comedy films
2010s Japanese films